Faleatiu is a village on the island of Upolu in Samoa. The village is on the north-west coast of the island and forms part of A'ano Alofi 4 Electoral Constituency (Faipule District) which forms part of the larger A'ana political district.

The population is 675.

The village is the ancestral home of boxer David Tua.

References

Populated places in A'ana